This is a list of notable people who were enrolled or employed at La Salle Extension University in Chicago.

Graduates
Harold Arthur (1904–1971), Governor of Vermont from 1950 to 1951 
Maryam Babangida (1948–2009), Nigerian diplomat, wife of General Ibrahim Badamosi Babangida
Bertram L. Baker (1898-1985), American politician, New York State Assemblyman from 1948 to 1970.
Stephen Barrett (born 1933), American psychiatrist, author, co-founder of the National Council Against Health Fraud
Madge Bradley (1904-2000), attorney and judge in San Diego, California
Peter M. Callan (1894–1965), Illinois state representative
Linwood Clark (1876–1965), U.S. Representative from Maryland
Bruce C. Clarke (1901–1988), U.S. Army general who served as commander-in-chief in Europe
Arthur Fletcher (1924–2005), government official known for affirmative action (Revised Philadelphia Plan), head of the United Negro College Fund
John Strickland Gibson (1893–1960), U.S. Representative from Georgia
William Thomas Granahan (1895–1956), U.S. Congressman from Pennsylvania 1945–47 and 1949–56 
Patricia Herzog (1922-2010), lawyer involved in key marital law case in California.
Frank Reed Horton (1896–1966), Alpha Phi Omega founder 
Tom Huening (born 1942), American author, politician, and businessman
Philippe Kieffer (1899-1962), French Navy officer
Barry Melton (born 1947), guitarist (Country Joe and The Fish), criminal defense attorney.
John Warwick Montgomery (born 1931), American lawyer, theologian and academic known for his work in the field of Christian Apologetics; Distinguished Research Professor of Philosophy and Christian Thought at Patrick Henry College. 
Edwin W. Blomquist, member of the Wisconsin State Assembly and mayor of Adams, Wisconsin
Jessie Menifield Rattley (1929–2001), first Black female president of the National League of Cities, and Chairperson of the Virginia Civil Rights Commission 
Eurith D. Rivers (1895–1967), Georgia Governor from 1937 to 1941 
Gertrude Elzora Durden Rush (1880–1962), first black woman admitted to the bar in Iowa 
Arthur Shores (1904–1996), lawyer and civil rights advocate 
Barney F. Spott (1898–1975), Wisconsin State Assemblyman
Thelma Loyace Hawkins Stovall (1919–1994), Kentucky's first female Secretary of State, first female Lieutenant Governor, and female acting Governor 
Craig Lyle Thomas (1933–2007), Wyoming Congressman (1989–1995) and Senator (1995–2007) 
Stanley R. Tupper (1921–2006), U.S. Representative from Maine
Clarence D. Tuska (1896-1985), co-founder of the American Radio Relay League and Director of Patent Operations at the Radio Corporation of America
Kenneth Walker (1898–1943), United States Army Air Forces general, awarded the Medal of Honor
Vic C. Wallin, Wisconsin State Assemblyman

Instructors and administrators
Jesse Grant Chapline (1870–1937), founder
Hugo Münsterberg (1863–1916), psychologist and textbook author 
Adlai E. Stevenson I (1835–1914), politician, taught at LaSalle Extension University in its business and law programs.

References

Defunct private universities and colleges in Illinois
Universities and colleges in Chicago